The Aitoliko Lagoon (  Limnothalassa Aitolikou) is a lagoon located in the south of Aetolia-Acarnania, Greece. It is separated from the larger Missolonghi Lagoon (a bay of the Gulf of Patras) to the south by the island of Aitoliko, but together they form the Missolonghi–Aitoliko Lagoons complex. Its maximum depth is 28 metres. At a salinity of 19-28 PSU, its water is brackish. Oxygen depletion occurs in a large part of the lagoon, but has been reduced since 2002 by creating larger openings around Aitoliko island and dredging channels in Messolongi Lagoon. The main settlement on the lagoon is the town Aitoliko.

References

Landforms of Aetolia-Acarnania
Lagoons of Greece